Embers is the debut album of Libyan-born American singer-songwriter and former iiO front-woman Nadia Ali, released on September 15, 2009 by Smile in Bed Records. The album features Billboard Hot Dance Club Songs number one single "Love Story", top 4 single "Fine Print" and top 6 single "Crash and Burn". On December 1, 2010, the Morgan Page remix of "Fantasy" was nominated in the Best Remixed Recording, Non-Classical category at the 53rd Grammy Awards.

Background
Nadia Ali gained prominence as the front-woman of the house act iiO, with their single "Rapture". She left the band in 2005 to pursue a solo project. Ali stated it took her over four years to produce the album as she was busy touring and because she was still learning as an artist and trying to establish her identity as a songwriter and co-producer. Further describing the delay, she said "I think every artist is constantly evolving. It was important for me to showcase my more thoughtful side." Ali collaborated with producers Fritzy, Sultan and Ned Shepard and Alex Sayz and co-produced each track on the album. She wrote all the tracks on the album besides "Promises".

She decided to name the album Embers because, as she said, "most of the songs that I wrote were about relationships that I've experienced and how they leave like tiny embers inside me still". Explaining further she stated "Embers are the smoldering remains of a fire that was once ablaze. It represents all of the feelings that still remain even when that particular situation [or] relationship is over".

Talking about the songs on the album she mentioned that she chose "Fantasy" as the last single on her album, because of how it summed her up "as an emotional songwriter who loves being a part of electronic music". Speaking about ballads on the album, she stated that she didn't want a typical dance album but more variety so she chose to go "experimental".

Track listing

Personnel
The following people contributed to Embers:

 Ossama Al Sarraf – Record producer, engineer and mixer
 Nadia Ali – songwriting, vocals and producer
 Paul Bosko – songwriting (track 11)
 Scott 'Fritzy' Fritz – producer, engineer and mixer
 Dave Kutch – mastering
 Gabriella Manrique – graphic design
 Nausheen Shah – styling
 Ned Shepard – producer, engineer and mixer
 Alex Sayz – producer, engineer and mixer
 Nick Wahlberg – producer, engineer and mixer
 Jade Young – photography

References 

2009 debut albums
Nadia Ali (singer) albums